Takiabad (also Romanized as Takīābād; also known as Takī) is a village in Tula Rud Rural District, in the Central District of Talesh County, Gilan Province, Iran. At the 2006 census, its population was 875, in 197 families.

References 

Populated places in Talesh County